The Rio Rancho City Council is the elected legislative authority of the city of Rio Rancho, New Mexico. It consists of 6 members, elected from respective districts of the city on a non-partisan basis. The form of city government is council–manager government and home rule municipality. It meets in the New Council chambers at the Rio Rancho city hall in the northwest quadrant of the city.

Composition

Current members

External links
The Rio Rancho city council page

References

Rio Rancho, New Mexico
New Mexico city councils